Bruce Glen Eakin (born September 28, 1962) is a Canadian former professional ice hockey centre.  Eakin was drafted 204th overall by the Calgary Flames in the 1981 NHL Entry Draft, where he played nine games.  He later moved to the Detroit Red Wings where he played four games.  He spent much of his time in the AHL and the CHL.  He was later traded to the Edmonton Oilers in December 1985, but never played a game for the Oilers.  From 1986 through till his retirement in 1999, Eakin played in Europe, including ten seasons in Germany.  He also made one season stops in Switzerland, Finland and the United Kingdom.

Career statistics

Awards
 WHL First All-Star Team – 1982

External links

1962 births
Adirondack Red Wings players
Calgary Flames draft picks
Calgary Flames players
Canadian ice hockey centres
Colorado Flames players
Detroit Red Wings players
Düsseldorfer EG players
EHC Olten players
Ice hockey people from Winnipeg
KalPa players
Kassel Huskies players
Krefeld Pinguine players
Living people
London Knights (UK) players
Moncton Golden Flames players
New Haven Nighthawks players
Nova Scotia Oilers players
Nürnberg Ice Tigers players
Oklahoma City Stars players
SC Herisau players
St. James Canadians players
Saskatoon Blades players
Springfield Indians players
Wisconsin Badgers men's ice hockey players
Canadian expatriate ice hockey players in Finland
Canadian expatriate ice hockey players in Germany
NCAA men's ice hockey national champions